Grasslands Wildlife Management Area lies within the San Joaquin River basin in California and supports the largest remaining block of wetlands in the Central Valley, containing  of private wetlands and associated, and surrounding  of state and federal lands. Perpetual conservation easements on private lands have been purchased by the United States Fish and Wildlife Service.

Land management activities are the responsibility of the landowners, not the Service.

This area is extremely important to Pacific Flyway populations of 19 duck species and 6 goose species. The Grasslands Ecological Area has been officially recognized as an integral unit of the Western Hemispheric Shorebird Reserve Network.

Large concentrations of migratory waterfowl, wading birds, and shorebirds are common and easily observed during late winter and early spring.

See also
Category: Native grasses of California
List of protected grasslands of North America

References

Grasslands of California
National Wildlife Refuges in California
Parks in the San Joaquin Valley
Protected areas of Merced County, California
Natural history of the Central Valley (California)
Geography of Merced County, California
Ramsar sites in the United States
Wetlands of California